The Grave is an Israeli drama television series that was first broadcast in Israel on Keshet 12 in October 2019. The series was created by Omri Givon. It uses flashbacks to account for differing time periods, and explains ideas such of multiverses, time travel, and includes references to scientists such as Einstein, Leibniz and Boltzmann.

Plot 
An earthquake in the north of Israel reveals a large pit in a nature reserve. Three human skeletons are discovered in the pit, and the plot gets complicated when DNA tests reveal that the three bodies' DNA corresponds to that of three human beings which are still alive.

The first is Yoel Russo, a nature reserve inspector, who raises his only son after losing his wife Hila in a car accident nine years earlier.

The other is Noam Zaid, better known as Nico, a sensory artist. During one of his shows, he gets a disturbing vision through Keren, who volunteers for his demonstration. In the vision, Nico appears to murder Keren and throw her body into a creek.

The third is a young prisoner named Avigail Lavi, who is charged with murder and serving a prison sentence in a women's prison.

Police investigator Gabi and Detective Chava Popper are investigating the subject of skeletons found in the pit. As the investigation progresses more and more questions arise and there seems no logical explanation.

Cast 
Liana Ayoun as Avigail Lavie, prisoner
Shalom Michaelashvili as Noam "Nico" Zaid
Nadav Netz as Yoel Russo, A grieving father who becomes obsessed with finding a way to cheat death when he hears of a scientific discovery of mysterious remains found after an earthquake.
Michal Kalman as Hava Popper, police investigator
Tsahi Halevi as Gabriel, policeman
Adam Karst as Adam, owner of Einstein-Rosen Company
Ortal Ben-Shoshan as Keren, Nico's girlfriend
Daniel Gal as Hila Russo, Yoel's wife
Vladimir Friedman as Professor Boltzmann
Daniel Schwabe as Noah Russo, Yoel's son

References

External links 
 

2019 Israeli television series debuts
Israeli drama television series
Channel 12 (Israel) original programming